This Life is a 2012 Danish drama film based on the activities of the Hvidsten Group, a Danish resistance group in World War II.

Cast and characters
 Jens Jørn Spottag as Marius Fiil
 Bodil Jørgensen as Gudrun Fiil
 Thomas Ernst as Niels Fiil
 Marie Bach Hansen as Tulle Fiil
 Laura Winther Møller as Gerda Fiil
 Mia Ejlerskov as Bitten Fiil
 Bjarne Henriksen as Albert Carlo Iversen
 Jesper Riefensthal as Peder Bergenhammer Sørensen
 Henrik Vestergaard as Johan Kjær Hansen
 Niels Lund Boesen as Niels Nielsen Kjær
 Arne Siemsen as Søren Peter Kristensen
 Janus Kim Elsig as Henning Andersen

References

External links
 
 

2012 drama films
2012 films
Danish drama films
Danish World War II films
Films about Danish resistance movement
2010s Danish-language films